Barnadesia ciliata is a species of flowering plant in the family Asteraceae. It is endemic to Ecuador. It has only been collected once, near Zaruma in El Oro Province in 1947. It is a shrub that grows in coastal foothill forest habitat. The area from which it was collected is undergoing habitat destruction.

References

Barnadesioideae
Endemic flora of Ecuador
Endangered plants
Taxonomy articles created by Polbot